Ulitsa Dybenko is a station on the Line 4 of Saint Petersburg Metro, opened on October 1, 1987.

Transport 
Buses: 4, 97, 140, 191, 228, 233, 234, 255A, 255Б, 264, 285, 288, 469, 469A, 485, 492A, 511, 565, 575, 579, 596Б, 692, 692A, 860, 860Л, 865, 879Д, 895. Trolleybuses: 14, 27, 28, 43. Trams: 7, 7A, 23, A. Minibus: 491, 492 (Staraya), 492 (Zh K Tsentralniy), 572A, 596A (po Stroiteley), 596A (po Yevropeyskomu), K-801.

External links

Saint Petersburg Metro stations
Railway stations in Russia opened in 1987
Railway stations located underground in Russia